Count Ivan Fyodorovich Paskevich-Erevansky, Serene Prince of Warsaw (tr. ;  – ) was an Imperial Russian military leader of Cossack origin who was the Namiestnik of Poland. Paskevich is known for leading Russian forces in Poland during the November uprising and for a series of leadership roles throughout the early and mid-19th century, such as the Russo-Persian War (1826–28) and the beginning phase of the Crimean War.

Paskevich started as an officer during the Napoleonic wars serving in the battles of Austerlitz and Borodino. After the war, he was a leader in the Russo-Persian War (1826–28). He was made Count of Yerevan in 1828. Afterward, he became Namiestnik of Poland in 1831 after he crushed the Polish rebels in the November uprising. He then helped crush the Hungarian Revolution of 1848. His last engagement was the Crimean War. Paskevich died in Warsaw in 1856.

He attained the rank of field marshal in the Russian army, and later in the Prussian and Austrian armies.

Early life 
Ivan Paskevich was born in Poltava on 19 May 1782, to the Paskevich family of Zaporozhian Cossack gentry He was educated at the Page Corps, where his progress was rapid, and in 1800 received his commission in the Guards and was named aide-de-camp to the tsar.

Early military career

Napoleonic Wars 
His first active service was in 1805, in the auxiliary army sent to the assistance of Austria against France, when he took part in the Battle of Austerlitz, 2 December 1805, where Austrian – Russian troops were defeated by the French under Napoleon.

From 1807 to 1812, Ivan Paskevich was engaged in the campaigns against the Ottomans, and distinguished himself by many brilliant and daring exploits, being made a general officer in his thirtieth year. During the war with France in 1812–1814 he was in command of the 26th division of infantry, and he won promotion to the rank of lieutenant general. During and after Napoleon's invasion of Russia Paskevich was engaged in the battles of Borodino, Dresden, Leipzig, and Paris (1814).

Ivan Paskevich wrote a memoir of some of his experiences during the Napoleonic wars.

The 1820s and the Russo-Persian War 

Before the Russo-Persian War (1826–28) then Lieutenant General Paskevich was made commander of the 1st Guard Infantry. In the unit the brother of Tsar Alexander and future Tsar Nicholas I. This started a relationship that had the future Tsar calling Ivan Paskevich "father-Commander" 

On the outbreak of Russo-Persian War (1826–28) in 1826 he was appointed second in command, and,  in the spring of the following year he replaced Aleksey Petrovich Yermolov as chief command. Under his leadership, Echmiadzin and the Nakhichevan Khanate were conquered from the Persians. After the Persians unsuccessfully tried to recapture Echmiadzin, the tsar granted Paskevich the title of "Erivanskii" (Count of Yerevan), a million rubles and a diamond-mounted sword for his services. The Russo-Turkish War, 1828–1829 immediately followed and he successfully led the eastern or Caucasus front. For this he was made a Field Marshal at the age of forty-seven. In 1830, he was engaged in the Caucasian War on the territory of present-day Dagestan. At the same time he appointed the high-ranking Muslim cleric Mir-Fatah-Agha from Iran as head of the recently established Caucasus Committee. Paskevich hoped that by the help of Mir-Fatah's high stature in the Muslim community, he could make a very valuable contribution to the Russian consolidation of power in the Caucasus. Together with Mir-Fatah's high esteem among Muslims and his devised plans for the Caucasus, they managed to keep the entire Caucasus stable from rebellious Muslim insurrections for many years to come.

Polish uprising and the Hungarian Revolution 
In June 1831, after the death of Field Marshal von Diebitsch, commander of Russian troops in Congress Poland, Paskevich was appointed his successor in crushing the Polish uprising. His armies, following the Battle of Ostrołęka in May, advanced slowly, but Paskevich redeemed his reputation at the Battle of Warsaw, giving a death blow to Polish hopes of restoring independence. He was created Prince of Warsaw and awarded the office of Namestnik of the Kingdom of Poland. With the kingdom's autonomy limited by the Organic Statute of the Kingdom of Poland, the period under Namestnik Paskevich – known in Poland as the "Paskevich Night" – became infamous for political and economic repressions, as well as for Russification.

On the outbreak of the Hungarian Revolution of 1848 he was appointed to command the Russian troops sent to aid Austria, and finally compelled the Hungarians' surrender at Világos.

Late career 
In 1854 Paskevich took command of the Army of the Danube, which was then engaging the Turks in the initial stage of the conflict which evolved into the Crimean War. Though he laid siege to Silistria, Paskevich advocated aborting the campaign due to Austria's threat to intervene in the war. On 9 June he suffered a combat injury and was compelled to return to Russia, handing command of the army to General Mikhail Dmitrievich Gorchakov. Paskevich died in Warsaw, where in 1870 a memorial was erected to him before the Koniecpolski Palace. It was demolished in October 1917 by the Poles. His remains were reburied by his son in the family mausoleum on the grounds of the Homel Palace. Both Paskevich's titles, Prince of Warsaw and Count of Erevan, went extinct with the death of his only son Lt. Gen. Fedor Paskevich in 1903.

Further reading 

 Paskevich, Ivan Fedorovich, svetleĭshiĭ kni︠a︡zʹ Varshavskiĭ (2019). Notes of the 1812 campaign. Jimmy Chen. [United Kingdom].

References

General references

External links 

1782 births
1856 deaths
People from Poltava
Russian people of Ukrainian descent
Field marshals of Russia
Russian nobility
Russian commanders of the Napoleonic Wars
People of the Russo-Persian Wars
Russo-Turkish War (1828–29)
Russian people of the November Uprising
People of the Revolutions of 1848
Members of the State Council (Russian Empire)
Namestniks of the Kingdom of Poland
Caucasus Viceroyalty (1801–1917)
1820s in Georgia (country)
Recipients of the Order of St. George of the First Degree
Recipients of the Order of St. George of the Second Degree
Recipients of the Order of St. George of the Third Degree
Recipients of the Order of the White Eagle (Russia)
Knights Grand Cross of the Military Order of William
Russian military personnel of the Caucasian War
Grand Crosses of the Military Order of Max Joseph
Grand Crosses of the Military Order of Maria Theresa
People of the Caucasian War